Ted Butler (16 July 1903 - 30 November 1981) was  a former Australian rules footballer who played with Footscray in the Victorian Football League (VFL).

Notes

External links 
		

1903 births
1981 deaths
Australian rules footballers from Victoria (Australia)
Western Bulldogs players